Our Race Will Rule Undisputed Over The World is a fabricated speech often cited in antisemitic propaganda, supposedly given by a Rabbi Emanuel Rabinovich. However, both the speech and Rabbi Rabinovich were, like the "Israel Cohen" of A Racial Program for the Twentieth Century, fictitious creations of Eustace Mullins.

The speech was alleged to have been delivered to the "Emergency Council of European Rabbis" in Budapest, Hungary on January 12, 1952. In it Rabinovich outlines a plan for Jews to subjugate the world via a "Third World War". This forgery is taken as evidence for a Jewish plot against gentiles in much the same way as, The Protocols of the Elders of Zion (invoked in the Rabinovich speech), is used as evidence of Jewish global conspiracy.

Mullins claimed to have received a copy of the speech from a Bulgarian diplomat defecting from the Communist government. According to Mullins, the diplomat had been hiding in Budapest where he received a copy of the speech, and then escaped to Hamburg, Germany, where he was given Mullins' name. The diplomat then allegedly emigrated to the United States, where he eventually met Mullins and gave him the copy.

The speech was first published in the May 1952 issue of Women's Voice and September 1952 issue of the Canadian Intelligence Service, published by the Ron Gostick and the antisemitic Canadian League of Rights. It also appeared in the antisemitic broadsheet Common Sense, (A Newspaper Upholding Christianity and Patriotism) published by Conde McGinley. The paper was notorious for its use of invented quotations and stories throughout the 1950s and 1960s, including, famously, a made-up quote by Nikita Khrushchev.

See also
 List of hoaxes
 A Racial Program for the Twentieth Century

References

Antisemitic forgeries
1950s hoaxes